Thomas Massey may refer to:
Thomas Massey (politician), Australian politician
Thomas Massey (MP) for City of Chester (UK Parliament constituency) 
 Thomas Massey House
Thomas Hacket Massey, who built Massey's Folly

See also
Thomas Massie (disambiguation)